Karlino  (formerly ) is a town in Białogard County, West Pomeranian Voivodeship, Poland.  It has a population of 5,729 (2004). Up to the Potsdam Agreement of 1945 it was part of Germany, a town in the Province of Pomerania.

Since the 14th century, the bishops of Cammin had their residence in  Körlin, which was their property.

The town is known in Poland for an oil gusher at a nearby exploration oil well, which erupted and caught fire on December 9, 1980. It burned until January 14, 1981, when it was finally put out, after dominating the news for weeks. However, the hopes for oil riches which this event engendered were brief, and in the end the amount of oil discovered was not sufficient for profitable production.

International relations

Karlino is twinned with:

References

External links

 Official town webpage

Cities and towns in West Pomeranian Voivodeship
Białogard County